Prophet, seer, and revelator is an ecclesiastical title used in the Latter Day Saint movement. The Church of Jesus Christ of Latter-day Saints (LDS Church) is the largest denomination of the movement, and it currently applies the terms to the members of the First Presidency and the Quorum of the Twelve Apostles. In the past, it has also been applied to the Presiding Patriarch of the church and the Assistant President of the Church. Other denominations of the movement also use these terms.

Origin of the phrase
The phrase "prophet, seer, and revelator" is derived from a number of revelations Joseph Smith, founder of the Latter Day Saint movement, said he received. The first revelation Smith said he received after the organization of the Church of Christ on April 6, 1830, declared that "there shall be a record kept among you; and in it [Smith] shalt be called a seer, a translator, a prophet, an apostle of Jesus Christ, an elder of the church through the will of God the Father, and the grace of your Lord Jesus Christ". In 1835, Smith further clarified the role of the President of the Church, "to preside over the whole church, and ... to be a seer, a revelator, a translator, and a prophet". In 1841, Smith recorded a revelation that again restated these roles: "I give unto you my servant Joseph to be a presiding elder over all my church, to be a translator, a revelator, a seer, and prophet." In 1836, at the dedication of the Kirtland Temple, approximately one year after Smith organized the church's Quorum of the Twelve Apostles, he instructed that the members of the First Presidency and the apostles should also be accepted by the church as prophets, seers, and revelators:

I made a short address, and called upon the several quorums, and all the congregation of Saints, to acknowledge the Presidency as Prophets and Seers and uphold them by their prayers. ... I then called upon the quorums and congregation of Saints, to acknowledge the Twelve, who were present, as Prophets, Seers, Revelators, and special witnesses to all the nations of the earth holding the keys of the kingdom, to unlock it, or cause it to be done among them, and uphold them by their prayers.

Later, Smith further confirmed that people other than the President of the Church may hold these titles. For example, in 1841, a revelation described the role of Smith's brother Hyrum Smith as Assistant President of the Church: "And from this time forth I appoint unto him that he may be a prophet, and a seer, and a revelator unto my church, as well as my servant Joseph".

Meanings of the terms
The words prophet, seer, and revelator have separate and distinct meanings within the Latter Day Saint movement. LDS Church apostle John A. Widtsoe described the meanings of the terms and the differences between them:

A prophet is a teacher. That is the essential meaning of the word. He teaches the body of truth, the gospel, revealed by the Lord to man; and under inspiration explains it to the understanding of the people. He is an expounder of truth. Moreover, he shows that the way to human happiness is through obedience to God's law. He calls to repentance those who wander away from the truth. He becomes a warrior for the consummation of the Lord’s purposes with respect to the human family. The purpose of his life is to uphold the Lord's plan of salvation. All this he does by close communion with the Lord, until he is "full of power by the spirit of the Lord." (Micah ; see also D&C 20:26; 34:10; 43:16)

The teacher must learn before he can teach. Therefore in ancient and modern times there have been schools of the prophets, in which the mysteries of the kingdom have been taught to men who would go out to teach the gospel and to fight the battles of the Lord. These "prophets" need not be called to an office; they go out as teachers of truth, always and everywhere.

A prophet also receives revelations from the Lord. These may be explanations of truths already received, or new truths not formerly possessed by man. Such revelations are always confined to the official position held. The lower will not receive revelations for the higher office.

In the course of time the word "prophet" has come to mean, perhaps chiefly, a man who receives revelations, and directions from the Lord. The principal business of a prophet has mistakenly been thought to foretell coming events, to utter prophecies, which is only one of the several prophetic functions.

In the sense that a prophet is a man who receives revelations from the Lord, the titles "seer and revelator" merely amplify the larger and inclusive meaning of the title "prophet." Clearly, however, there is much wisdom in the specific statement of the functions of the prophet as seer and revelator, as is done in the conferences of the Church.

A seer is one who sees with spiritual eyes.  He perceives the meaning of that which seems obscure to others; therefore he is an interpreter and clarifier of eternal truth. He foresees the future from the past and the present. This he does by the power of the Lord operating through him directly, or indirectly with the aid of divine instruments such as the Urim and Thummim. In short, he is one who sees, who walks in the Lord's light with open eyes. (Book of Mormon, Mosiah 8:15–17)

A revelator makes known, with the Lord's help, something before unknown. It may be new or forgotten truth, or a new or forgotten application of known truth to man’s need. Always, the revelator deals with truth, certain truth (D&C 100:11) and always it comes with the divine stamp of approval. Revelation may be received in various ways, but it always presupposes that the revelator has so lived and conducted himself as to be in tune or harmony with the divine spirit of revelation, the spirit of truth, and therefore capable of receiving divine messages.

In summary: A prophet is a teacher of known truth; a seer is a perceiver of hidden truth, a revelator is a bearer of new truth. In the widest sense, the one most commonly used, the title 'prophet' includes the other titles and makes of the prophet, a teacher, perceiver, and bearer of truth.

Current usage within the LDS Church
At the biannual general conference of the LDS Church, the name of the President of the Church is presented to the members as "prophet, seer, and revelator and President of The Church of Jesus Christ of Latter-day Saints". Members are invited to sustain the president in these roles, and the signalling for any in opposition is also allowed. Additionally, the counselors in the First Presidency and the members of the Quorum of the Twelve Apostles are sustained by the membership as "prophets, seers, and revelators". Until October 1979, the Presiding Patriarch of the church was also sustained as a "prophet, seer, and revelator". Apostles who are not members of the Quorum of the Twelve or the First Presidency and other general authorities, (e.g., members of the Quorums of the Seventy and Presiding Bishopric) are not sustained as prophets, seers, and revelators.

The procedure of sustaining is repeated in local congregations of the LDS Church several times per year at stake, district, ward, or branch conferences. These procedures are mandated by the theology of the LDS Church, which dictates governance by the "common consent" of the membership, wherein no one serves on the local or general level unless he or she has been formally sustained by individual congregations or the church as a whole.

See also

 Russell M. Nelson
 Prophet#Latter Day Saint movement
 Revelation#Latter Day Saint concept of revelation
 Revelation (Latter Day Saints)
 Seer stone (Latter Day Saints)
 Urim and Thummim#In the Latter Day Saint movement
 We Thank Thee, O God, for a Prophet

Notes

References
John A. Widtsoe, (1960). Evidences and Reconciliations, Salt Lake City: Bookcraft, 256–58.
"Gospel Topics: Prophets", churchofjesuschrist.org

External links
"Prophet, Seer, and Revelator", josephsmith.net
James E. Faust, "Continuing Revelation", Ensign, August 1996, p. 2.
Jeffrey R. Holland, "Prophets, Seers, and Revelators", Ensign, November 2004, p. 6.
Harold B. Lee, "The President—Prophet, Seer, and Revelator", Ensign, August 1972, p. 35.
Dennis B. Neuenschwander, "Living Prophets, Seers, and Revelators", Ensign, November 2000, p. 40.
Book of Mormon, Mosiah 8:13–18

 
Leadership positions in the Church of Jesus Christ of Latter-day Saints
Seership in Mormonism